Lawan may refer to:
Lawan, Dausa, a village on RJ Sh2 Dausa, Rajasthan 
 Lawan, Mahendergarh, a village of Haryana, India
 Lawan, Nepal, a village development committee
 Lawan, Jaisalmer, a village on NH-114 in Jaisalmer District, Rajasthan, India
 Farouk Lawan (born 1962), Nigerian politician
 Lawan, an electoral ward in the Baringo North Constituency, Kenya
"Lawan", a 2021 protest movement in Malaysia

See also 
 Lawaan, Eastern Samar, Philippines
 Luan (disambiguation)